is a Japanese football player. He plays for MIO Biwako Shiga.

Playing career
Minato Yoshida joined to J3 League club; AC Nagano Parceiro in 2014. On July 20, he debuted in a J3 match against Gainare Tottori. He played 4 matches in 2014 season. In August 2015, he moved to his local club; MIO Biwako Shiga. In 2017, he moved to Lagend Shiga FC.

References

External links

1992 births
Living people
Osaka Gakuin University alumni
Association football people from Shiga Prefecture
Japanese footballers
J3 League players
Japan Football League players
AC Nagano Parceiro players
MIO Biwako Shiga players
Association football midfielders